Afratakht (also Romanized as Afrātakht) is a village in Bahnemir Rural District, Bahnemir District, Babolsar County, Mazandaran Province, Iran. At the 2006 census, its population was 478, in 117 families.

References 

Populated places in Babolsar County